Bathypontiidae is a family of copepods belonging to the order Calanoida.

Genera:
 Alloiopodus Bradford, 1969
 Temorites Sars, 1900
 Temoropsis Wolfenden, 1911
 Zenkevitchiella Brodsky, 1955

References

Copepods